Berlinski (or Berliński in its native Polish form) is a surname. Notable people with the surname include:

Claire Berlinski (born 1968), American writer and journalist
David Berlinski (born 1942), American philosopher, educator and writer
Herman Berlinski (1910–2001), German-born American composer, organist, musicologist and choir conductor
Hirsch Berlinski (1908–1944), Polish resistance fighter
Mischa Berlinski (born 1973), American writer
Rafał Berliński (born 1976), Polish footballer
Ron Berlinski (born 1994), German footballer

See also
 
 Berlinsky